The BMW CE 04 is an electric scooter produced by BMW Motorrad.

History

The Concept Link design study gave an initial preview for the successor to the C evolution electric scooter as early as 2017, when it was shown at the Concorso d'Eleganza Villa d'Este in Lake Como, Italy. The Concept Link featured a touchscreen instrument panel and luggage compartment beneath the rider's seat, using space made available through an electric traction motor; the "Link" name referred to internet connectivity features, including the ability to plot routes and select music based on the rider's appointment calendar. As an accessory, a jacket wirelessly linked to the scooter allowed the rider to manipulate controls by making specific gestures.

An updated concept named Definition CE 04 was shown in November 2020 at BMW's "Next/Gen 2020" virtual show; at the time, BMW hinted a closely-related production model would follow. The Definition concept included a large screen in the instrument panel, connected to the user's smartphone; the matching riding jacket was illuminated for visibility and contained a pocket that would charge the phone wirelessly. By March 2021, leaked patent images indicated that BMW had completed the design for a production version of the CE 04 with very few changes from the earlier Concept Link and Definition concepts.

In July 2021, BMW officially presented the final production version of the CE 04, which is scheduled to go on sale in February 2022. The "04" in the name refers to the market segment (400 cc gasoline-powered scooters) at which it is intended. At Milipol 2021 in November, BMW showed a CE 04 equipped with a police package, which adds typical emergency vehicle equipment including LED strobe lights, siren, additional secured storage, and extra radio.

Design

Styling
The CE 04 implements the styling from the Concept Link in production form with changes to make it road-legal, including mirrors and license plate mounts; The Verge noted the Concept Link looked like "[it would] be right at home in a sci-fi movie like Blade Runner" in 2017 and called the follow-up Definition CE 04 concept of November 2020 "straight out of a William Gibson novel. The elongated, low vehicle body and the diagonally rising front end create a clean break from the look of scooters as we know them." Deliberate rear panel gaps were left to provide a hint of the mechanics of the scooter.

Powertrain and battery
The powertrain of the CE 04 is derived from BMW automobiles.

The electric traction motor is mounted to the chassis, not the swingarm, reducing unsprung weight. A toothed belt drive is used to transmit power from the motor to the rear wheel. Three driving modes are available (Eco, Rain, and Road), controlling the amount of throttle response and regenerative braking; an optional driving mode (Dynamic) provides the most aggressive throttle response and strongest regeneration.

The scooter is equipped with a 147.6 V, 60.6 A-hr / 8.9 kW-hr (8.5 usable) lithium-ion storage battery originally designed for the iX and i4. The battery is attached to a cooling plate with fins, allowing heat to dissipate through the air. Estimated range is  using the WLTP cycle. It is capable of AC charging at up to 6.9 kW; it is not equipped with a DC fast charging inlet. Charging times (for battery state from 0% to 100%) are estimated to range from 4 hours, 20 minutes (using a 2.3 kW / Level 1 AC supply) to 1 hour, 40 minutes (6.9 kW / Level 2). On Level 2 charging, it takes 45 minutes to bring the battery from 20% to 80% state of charge.

The CE 04 is fitted with mechanical brakes; the front fork has twin  discs with 4-piston fixed calipers, while the rear wheel is equipped with a single  disc and single-piston floating caliper. A two-channel anti-lock braking system from Bosch is fitted; as an option, the ABS Pro system includes a tilt sensor, regulating braking during cornering.

Features
The instrument panel features a  TFT color screen with integrated navigation and connectivity with the rider's smartphone through a USB-C charging port. LED lights are standard. Traction control is available as an option. An adaptive headlight is optional, which provides additional light depending on lean angle.

A reversing aid is provided, controlled by a handlebar-mounted switch on the left side. When activated, the vehicle reverses at a walking pace.

References

CE 04
Electric scooters